Edward Montagu (1692–1776) was a wealthy English landowner, who owned numerous coal mines and had several rents and estates in Northumberland. The son of Hon. Charles Montagu, MP, by Sarah Rogers, and the grandson of Edward Montagu, 1st Earl of Sandwich, he was educated at Eton College, Clare College, Cambridge and Lincoln's Inn.

In 1730 he became the leaseholder of the small estate of Sandleford, south of Newbury on the Berkshire-Hampshire border, and in 1742 he married Elizabeth Robinson (despite her seeing marriage as a rational and expedient convention rather than something done out of love).  At that date, she was twenty-two and he was fifty years old.  The marriage was advantageous, but it was apparently not very passionate.  All the same, she bore a son, John, the next year, and she loved her child immensely.  When John died unexpectedly in 1744, Elizabeth was devastated and, though the couple remained friendly throughout their remaining time together, there were no more children or pregnancies.

In December 1745 he was elected a Fellow of the Royal Society, on the grounds of being a gentleman of great merit, well versed in mathematical and Philosophical Learning, curious in most of the branches of natural learning, his proposers were Montagu; Martin Folkes; William Jones; John Machin; Shallet Turner; Abraham de Moivre; Peter Davall (d.1763, the society's secretary); and his brother-in-law George L. Scott.

Beginning in 1750, he and Elizabeth established a routine where they would winter in London in Mayfair and then, in the spring, go to Sandleford Priory.  He would then go on to Northumberland and Yorkshire to manage his holdings, while she would occasionally accompany him.  In the late 1760s, he fell ill, and his wife took care of him, although she resented giving up her freedom.  He died on 20 May 1776, in his eighty-fourth year, bequeathing her all his wealth and property.

MP for Huntingdon
For over 30 years, from 1734–1768, Montagu was MP for the borough of Huntingdon, a seat controlled by his cousin John Montagu, 4th Earl of Sandwich.

Some of Montagu's and his wife's ancestors

References 

1692 births
1776 deaths
People from Newbury, Berkshire
People associated with Sandleford, Berkshire
Alumni of Clare College, Cambridge
Members of Lincoln's Inn
18th-century English landowners
British MPs 1734–1741
British MPs 1741–1747
British MPs 1747–1754
British MPs 1754–1761
British MPs 1761–1768
Members of the Parliament of Great Britain for English constituencies
Edward Montagu (1692-1775)
Fellows of the Royal Society